José Luiz Drey (born September 23, 1973), sometimes known as Zé Luiz, is a former Brazilian football player, coaching assistant, and manager.

Club statistics

References

External links

1973 births
Living people
Brazilian footballers
Brazilian expatriate footballers
J1 League players
Shonan Bellmare players
Expatriate footballers in Japan
Association football defenders